Battus ingenuus, the Dyar's swallowtail or confused swallowtail, is a species of butterfly in the family Papilionidae.

Description
The uppersides of the wings are basically black with greenish reflections and pale green patches on the hindwings, while the undersides are mainly brownish, with red and white spots on the edges of the hindwings. The body is blackish, with yellow spots on the sides of the thorax and the abdomen and a few white spots on the underside of the abdomen. Males have a pale yellowish-greenish upper abdomen.

Distribution

Battus ingenuus is present from southeastern Mexico to eastern Venezuela (Belize, Colombia, Costa Rica, Ecuador, El Salvador, Honduras, Nicaragua, Panama, Peru and Trinidad).

Habitat
In monsoonal areas of Costa Rica, the habitat is known as tropical deciduous forest, where most of the trees lose their leaves at the end of the dry season.

Life cycle
The larvae feed on Aristolochia constricta. As the caterpillars feed off these poisonous pipevines, the insects become poisonous themselves, tasting very bad to birds.

References

Further reading
 
Edwin Möhn, 2002 Schmetterlinge der Erde, Butterflies of the World Part V (5), Papilionidae II: Battus. Edited by Erich Bauer and Thomas Frankenbach Keltern: Goecke & Evers; Canterbury: Hillside Books.  Illustrates and identifies 14 species and 49 subspecies. Page 7, plate 11, figures 1–8, plate 19, figures 7–8.

External links
 Neotropical Butterflies
 "Battus ingenuus (Dyar, 1907)". Insecta.pro.
 Sangay National Park Ecuador
 Real life image of Battus ingenuus

ingenuus
Butterflies of Central America
Butterflies of North America
Butterflies of Trinidad and Tobago
Papilionidae of South America
Lepidoptera of Bolivia
Lepidoptera of the Caribbean
Lepidoptera of Colombia
Lepidoptera of Ecuador
Lepidoptera of Peru
Lepidoptera of Venezuela
Butterflies described in 1907